The Cumbres and Toltec Scenic Railroad, often abbreviated as the C&TSRR, is a  narrow-gauge heritage railroad that operates on  of track between Antonito, Colorado, and Chama, New Mexico, in the United States. The railroad is named for two geographical features along the route: the -high Cumbres Pass and the Toltec Gorge. Originally part of the Denver and Rio Grande Western Railroad's narrow-gauge network, the line has been jointly owned by the states of Colorado and New Mexico since 1970. Today, the C&TSRR is one of only two remaining parts of the former D&RGW narrow-gauge network, the other being the Durango and Silverton Narrow Gauge Railroad (D&SNG), which runs between the communities of Durango and Silverton, Colorado. The railroad has a total of ten narrow-gauge steam locomotives (five of which are operational) and two narrow-gauge diesel locomotives on its  current roster. The railroad also operates two smaller former D&RGW steam locomotives, Nos. 315 and 168, for special events and excursions.

History

On February 20, 1880, track crews of the Denver and Rio Grande Railway (D&RG) began to lay the first rails of the San Juan Extension going south from Alamosa, Colorado, toward Antonito, Colorado, arriving in March of that year. The company chose the narrow gauge of three feet instead of the standard gauge of four feet eight and a half inches. This was because the narrow gauge was cheaper to build, and a narrow gauge railway can accommodate tighter-radius curves. This allowed laying track where standard gauge would not fit. From Antonito, the line continued west to Chama, New Mexico, arriving there on December 31, 1880. The track had come  through two tunnels, over a  mountain pass, and skirted a 600-foot gorge. The line then went on towards Durango, Colorado. The purpose of this extension was to tap into the mineral resources around the Silverton, Colorado area.

When the Denver and Rio Grande Western Railroad arrived in Chama, other railroad companies were formed to take advantage of the local forests. This created a flourishing logging economy for the town. There were lumber mills located to the west and south of Chama. These mills provided a steady stream of revenue for the railroad, lasting until abandonment in the late 1960s.

After World War II, there was an oil boom in Farmington, New Mexico. This boom provided a surge of revenue for the railroad. This revenue consisted of 60-car pipe trains going west from Antonito. The Gramps Oil Fields of southern Colorado provided oil cargo for trains from Chama to Antonito. The lumber mills also provided a steady stream of revenue, although this was less important than oil. This increase in revenue saved the line from abandonment.

All of these successes had drawbacks. The major issue with the line was Cumbres Pass itself. The high elevation and various other factors lead to many terrible snow storms. This prompted the railroad to purchase “rotary snowplows”. The two that were used on the Cumbres Pass line were Rotary OM and Rotary OY. Both rotaries are still in existence in Chama, New Mexico, but historically they are dispatched from Alamosa. Every five or six years, the winter season has as much as 500 inches of snow fall on Cumbres. These snow storms were a huge financial burden for the railroad. The “Granddaddy of All Snowstorms”  hit in the winter of 1951–1952. This was the worst recorded winter on the line and one of the deciding factors when abandonment was considered in the 1960s.

In September 1968, the Denver and Rio Grande Western Railroad filed for abandonment of its narrow gauge lines. In April 1969, legislation was signed in New Mexico that provided a way for the state of New Mexico to buy the track between Chama and Antonito. In 1970, Colorado passed similar legislation. The two states took joint ownership of the line and,  by 1971, the Cumbres and Toltec Scenic Railroad was formed.

Notable incidents

2002 shutdowns
In 2002, the C&TSRR was shut down twice, first in the spring to resolve track bed issues. In the summer, operations were suspended again because of wildfire dangers.

Lobato trestle fire
While the bridge was out of service, the C&TSRR operated limited services from the Chama end while trains from Antonito only traveled to Osier and back. After undergoing extensive refurbishment, the bridge was reopened on June 20, 2011.

National Historic Landmark
In 1973, the Cumbres and Toltec Scenic Railroad was listed on the National Register of Historic Places and its boundaries were increased in 2007. The railroad was designated as a National Historic Civil Engineering Landmark by the American Society of Civil Engineers in 1976. In 2012, the railroad was designated a National Historic Landmark, for its engineering, well-preserved infrastructure and equipment and the role of the railroad in the development of the region it served.

Current operations
The Cumbres and Toltec Scenic Railroad operates between late May and late October, with two trains (one in each direction) departing each morning from Antonito, Colorado, and Chama, New Mexico. Both trains meet at Osier, Colorado for lunch. At Osier, lunch is served to passengers in a modern dining hall. From there, passengers have the option to continue to the other side of the railroad, or they can switch trains and return to their point of origin. Once the westbound train arrives at Cumbres Pass, passengers have the option to board motorcoaches to return to Antonito, or they can save an hour and continue into Chama. The continental-divide trail brings hikers through Cumbres Pass as well. The railroad offers these hikers a ride down the mountain from the pass if desired. At the end of the day at both ends, motorcoaches are again provided for passengers who came from the opposite end. The motorcoach ride is about one hour long.

In addition to the through service, the C&TSRR operates various special excursions during the season such as dinner trains.  On certain days during the holiday season, the railroad offers special "Santa Trains" from both Chama and Antonito, and guests are encouraged to bring gifts and/or food for the less fortunate.

Operator changes
After the C&TSRR was formed in 1971, a bi-state agency, the Cumbres and Toltec Scenic Railroad Commission was created. Railroad operations were then contracted to third-party rail operators. In 2012, after long discussions with other third-parties bidding to take over, the Commission formed its own operating company, Cumbres and Toltec Operating LLC They hired John Bush, a veteran of the railroad, to become president on December 13, 2012.   Bush retired on November 14, 2020.

Friends of the C&TSRR
In 1988, a nonprofit organization called the Friends of the Cumbres and Toltec Scenic Railroad was established to preserve the history of the railroad and help maintain infrastructure and rolling stock. The Friends of the C&TSRR also participates in various education programs and provides the railroad guides, known as docents, who inform passengers of historical aspects of the railroad as well as locations of interest.

Route description

Locations along the line
 Chama, New Mexico 
 Cumbres Pass 
 Osier, Colorado 
 Toltec Gorge, New Mexico 
 Sublette Station 
 Antonito, Colorado

Chama to Osier

Chama Yard 
The Chama yard is located at milepost 344.12. Here, the railroad stores most of its freight cars and both rotary snowplows, Rotary OY and Rotary OM. On the east side is part of the original roundhouse from the D&RGW. A fire burned most of the roundhouse years ago; what remains is used as storage for parts. K-37 locomotive No. 497 is currently stored here. On the far side of the old roundhouse section are the shops where the engines are serviced and prepared for the next day. The shops have two stalls and can hold two engines inside simultaneously. On the west side of the yard is the original depot from the late 1800s, where train tickets can be purchased. There is a gift shop with various items for sale. On the south end of the yard, over 100 freight cars are visible. The yard is open and can be toured by anyone. About 40 of the cars in the yard are operational.
From Chama, the railroad proceeds northeast after crossing Rio Chama. About  later, the railroad begins up the mountain on a grade averaging 4%. The first siding on the line is at Lobato (MP: 339.99). Here are remnants of a stock pen and a water tank made for a movie in the 1980s. The tank was used later in Indiana Jones and the Last Crusade. The water tank was knocked over in 2006, succumbing to age and high winds. Lobato Trestle is located at Lobato, and is the second-highest trestle on the line, built in 1883. Due to weight restrictions, only one locomotive at a time is allowed to cross. Hence, all double-headers must separate and rejoin on the other side. The bridge was rebuilt in 2011 after a fire nearly destroyed it.

From here to Cumbres, the railroad operates on the north side of Wolf Creek. There are several old stations along the line. The first is Dalton (MP: 335.5). There is nothing at Dalton besides the station sign. Next on the journey to the top at Cumbres, the train passes Cresco Siding and water tank (MP 335.5). Just before this, the track crosses the state line for the first time. This water tank is used when operating smaller engines, such as No. 315 and No. 168, and for rotary trains. The route then enters a small canyon past Hamilton's Point. Exiting the canyon, the track makes a turn to the northwest and up Wolf Creek through Coxo. At Coxo, there is a short siding for maintenance equipment and a station sign. At a narrow point of the valley, the track makes a horseshoe turn up to Windy Point. Windy Point is an outcrop of volcanic rock where the wind blows so hard that the smoke from the trains often will blow towards the front of the train instead of the rear. This is less than a quarter of a mile from Cumbres Pass, the highest point on the line

At Cumbres (MP 330.60), elevation , is the Car Inspector's House, Water Standpipe, remnants of the extensive snow shed and the Section House, which replaced the original depot after it was demolished in the 1950s. Cumbres is the highest point on the railroad and the highest elevation of any narrow-gauge railroad in North America. After taking on water and a short brake test, the train departs to the east and begins the downhill section. At “Tanglefoot Curve”, the track doubles back on itself to lose elevation gradually. Here, the trains going downhill will perform a boiler blowdown. This is where the engine releases steam from the boiler to clear sediments at the bottom of the boiler. From there,  the track turns north up the Los Piños Valley.

The track continues a gentle descent on the average 1.45% grade to the north until it reaches Los Piños tank. This tank is always full and is used for small engines and rotary trains. The track takes a gentle loop off to the west and comes back to the east at the station of Los Piños (MP: 324.8). There is nothing here except a siding and the station sign. The track then turns back north towards Osier, Colorado. Just before Osier, at Milepost 320, the track crosses Cascade Trestle. The train then stops at Osier, Colorado (MP: 318.40), where passengers are served lunch in a modern, wooden indoor facility.

Antonito to Osier

This section covers the eastern portion of the line, from the small cattle and junction town of Antonito to Osier, the mid-point of the line.

Antonito (MP 280.70) is a small company town of the former railroad main line. It is home to the C&TSRR car shop, a water tank and other relics. Most of the facilities were built by the C&TSRR, since the original rail yard, wye, and station were not sold to the states of Colorado and New Mexico.

Shortly after leaving the station, the train heads straight for  until coming into some hills. Shortly thereafter, the train crosses Ferguson's Trestle (MP 285.87), named for a man who was hanged from a locomotive there. The original trestle was featured in the 1988 television movie Where the Hell's That Gold?, starring Willie Nelson and Delta Burke. In filming, an explosion mishap occurred and the bridge was burned down. Traffic was halted for a week while the C&TSRR built a temporary bridge. Next winter, the trestle was rebuilt, matching the original. About  later, the train makes the first of 11 crossings into New Mexico and climbs a ledge up to a lava mesa. Lava (291.55) has the old water tank from Antonito, which was moved here in 1971. The track goes around a horseshoe curve that is also used as a reversing loop to turn the rotary snow plow trains from Chama.

Heading west, the track rounds Whiplash Curve, a double-horseshoe curve. About  from Whiplash Curve lie the sidings and wye at Big Horn. Past Big Horn, the train loops around the sides of mountains, going through horseshoe curves before reaching the first water stop at Sublette.

Sublette is an abandoned railroad section camp, consisting of a log bunk house, a section house, a siding and other buildings. There was once a water tank at the western end of the siding. Today, in its place, there is a standpipe. After the tender is filled with water, the train slowly creeps into lush aspen groves.

Following Sublette is Toltec Siding, which in the 1950s was the meeting place for oil well pipe trains moving between Chama and Farmington to Alamosa. Shortly afterwards, trains pass through Mud Tunnel, which is unique because it is lined with wooden pillars due to being bored through soft volcanic ash. When the beams in the tunnel collapsed, the D&RGW made a "shoo fly" (a temporary by-pass) to allow passengers and small cars to be moved around the tunnel to an awaiting train. After passing through this, trains pass around Phantom Curve and through Calico Cut, then slow when entering the longer Rock Tunnel. The line then follows the river to Osier.

Rolling stock

* No. 315 is not owned by the C&TSRR, but is included on the current roster due to frequent operations in special excursions and the indefinite loan.

Steam Locomotives
All of the steam locomotives operating on the C&TSRR are former Denver and Rio Grande Western Railroad locomotives. The railroad owns three classes of steam locomotives. The K-27, K-36 and K-37 engines are all outside frame  "Mikado" engines built by Baldwin Locomotive Works. As of 2023, of the ten steam locomotives currently owned by the C&TSRR, Nos. 463, 484, 487, 488 and 489 are all operational.

Locomotive 497, a class K-37 locomotive, was restored to operating condition for the Durango and Silverton Narrow Gauge Railroad in 1984 and was traded to the C&TSRR in late October 1991 in exchange for class K-36 locomotive 482. Locomotive 497 was later taken out of service in late 2002 and currently sits in storage in the Chama roundhouse awaiting an overhaul. On February 16, 2022, the railroad announced that K-37 locomotives 492 and 497 will both be evaluated to see which one is in better shape to be restored back to operating condition. Currently, it hasn't been disclosed yet on which one has been chosen for restoration.

In late 2019, locomotive 489, a class K-36 locomotive, went down for a Federal Railroad Administration (FRA) mandated 1,472-day inspection and replacement of the smokebox. However, the work was halted due to the Novel Coronavirus (COVID-19) pandemic in March 2020. The work resumed on the 1,472-day inspection and installation of the new smokebox in October 2020. On December 15, 2020, the railroad announced that they are converting locomotive 489 to burn oil instead of coal. The decision was made "to ensure viability in diverse environmental conditions." The conversion of locomotive 489 was completed in time for the opening of the 2021 operating season. On August 3, 2022, the railroad announced that parts have been ordered for a second K-36 locomotive to be converted to burn oil over the winter of 2022 to 2023. Currently, it hasn't been disclosed yet on which K-36 locomotive has been selected for the conversion.

The T-12 No. 168 is a  "Ten Wheeler" type inside frame engine also built by Baldwin Locomotive Works. This is the oldest steam locomotive operated by the railroad. Restoration work on No. 168 was completed in October 2019, and it now continues to operate on occasional special excursions on the C&TSRR. Another engine that operates on the railroad is D&RGW No. 315. No. 315 is a C-18 class inside frame  "Consolidation" type locomotive. It is owned by the Durango Railroad Historical Society, but it is on indefinite loan to the C&TSRR. Restoration work on No. 315 was completed in August 2007, and it continues to operate on occasional special excursions on both the D&SNG and the C&TSRR.

Diesel Locomotives
The C&TSRR owns two class DE General Electric 47-ton center-cab diesel locomotives built in 1943, Nos. 15 and 19, for emergency use when the steam locomotives are inoperative. They are also used for operations outside the normal operating season. Both came from the Oahu Railway and Land Company; No. 19 was purchased by the C&TSRR in 1972 and is currently stationed in Antonito. No. 15 was previously leased by the Georgetown Loop Railroad in the early 1990s and eventually purchased in 2013 where it is currently stationed in Chama.

Rotary Snowplows
The C&TSRR owns two rotary snowplows, Rotary OY and Rotary OM. Rotary OM was purchased in the late 1800s by the D&RGW and has served the line ever since. It has not been run since the 1970s because of mechanical issues. Rotary OY was built in the 1920s and has served in several places on the line. It was last run in late winter of 2020 to begin the 50th anniversary of the formation of the C&TSRR. There are no current plans to run the rotary again anytime soon, but it is in good condition and fully functional.

D&RGW No. 168

In 2016, D&RGW No. 168 arrived in Antonito from Colorado Springs, Colorado for restoration to working order. The engine had been on display for a long time in a public park, but was in good condition. Restoration began in March 2017 and was completed in October 2019. The restoration project was headed up by Cumbres and Toltec Special Projects department and led by Assistant General Manager Efstathios Papas. The project cost $508,000 and spanned 27 months. The railroad intends to use this engine frequently in normal excursion service as much as possible. As of 2021, No. 168 continues to operate in occasional special excursions on the C&TSRR.

Passenger Cars
For passenger services, the C&TSRR operates a mixture of flat roofed and clerestory cars, with interiors corresponding with the railroad's three classes of service: Coach, Deluxe (formerly Tourist class) and Parlor. In 2019, the car shop in Antonito, Colorado, finished the first in a line of new clerestory cars that will serve as standard passenger cars and new Parlor cars. This is part of an effort to retire the older flat roofed cars due to their age. The C&TSRR also operates observation gondolas as well as special coaches configured to accommodate wheelchairs and house concession areas.

Consist
A typical C&TSRR train includes:

 1 K-27, K-36 or K-37  steam locomotive (A second locomotive is normally added, depending on the length of the train)
 3 Coaches (On some days, extra coaches are added to meet demand)
 1 ADA/Concession coach
 1 Observation gondola
 1 Deluxe class coach
 1 Parlor class coach

Freight cars 
The Cumbres and Toltec Scenic Railroad also owns a varied collection of former D&RGW narrow-gauge freight cars for display and use in nostalgic railtours.

In popular culture
Over the years, the railroad was featured in several documentaries and films.  Among these are:

 The Good Guys and the Bad Guys, 1969 
 Shoot Out, 1971
 Showdown, 1973
 The Fortune, 1975
 Bite the Bullet, 1975
 The Missouri Breaks, 1976
 Butch and Sundance: The Early Days, 1979
 Indiana Jones and the Last Crusade, 1989
 Ghost Trains of the Old West, 1990
 America's Historic Steam Railroads: Cumbres and Toltec Scenic Railroad, 1999
 A Million Ways to Die in the West, 2014
 Hostiles, 2017
 The Harder They Fall, 2021

See also

 D & RG Narrow Gauge Trestle
 List of Colorado historic railroads
 List of Denver and Rio Grande Western Railroad lines
 List of heritage railroads in the United States
 Narrow-gauge railroads in the United States
 San Juan Express
 National Register of Historic Places listings in Colorado § Archuleta County
 National Register of Historic Places listings in Conejos County, Colorado
 National Register of Historic Places listings in Rio Arriba County, New Mexico
 List of National Historic Landmarks in Colorado
 List of National Historic Landmarks in New Mexico

References

Further reading

External links

 
 Cumbres & Toltec Scenic Railroad Photos
 Friends of the Cumbres & Toltec Scenic Railroad

3 ft gauge railways in the United States
Heritage railroads in Colorado
Heritage railroads in New Mexico
Historic Civil Engineering Landmarks
Historic districts on the National Register of Historic Places in Colorado
Historic districts on the National Register of Historic Places in New Mexico
Museums in Rio Arriba County, New Mexico
Narrow gauge railroads in Colorado
Narrow gauge railroads in New Mexico
Passenger rail transportation in Colorado
Passenger rail transportation in New Mexico
Railroad museums in New Mexico
Railroad-related National Historic Landmarks
Spin-offs of the Denver & Rio Grande Western Railroad
Transportation in Alamosa County, Colorado
Transportation in Archuleta County, Colorado
Transportation in Conejos County, Colorado
Transportation in Rio Arriba County, New Mexico
Tourist attractions in Alamosa County, Colorado
Tourist attractions in Archuleta County, Colorado
Tourist attractions in Conejos County, Colorado
Tourist attractions in Rio Arriba County, New Mexico
National Register of Historic Places in Conejos County, Colorado
National Register of Historic Places in Archuleta County, Colorado
National Register of Historic Places in Rio Arriba County, New Mexico
Railway lines on the National Register of Historic Places
Rail infrastructure on the National Register of Historic Places in Colorado
Rail infrastructure on the National Register of Historic Places in New Mexico
National Historic Landmarks in New Mexico
National Historic Landmarks in Colorado
National Historic Landmark Districts
United States interstate compacts